Gervas Evelyn Pierrepont, 6th Earl Manvers, MC, JP (15 April 1881 – 13 February 1955), known as Gervas Pierrepont until 1940, was a British nobleman, soldier, landowner and member of the House of Lords.

Biography
The eldest son of the Honourable Evelyn Henry Pierrepont, second son of Sydney Pierrepont, 3rd Earl Manvers, Pierrepont was educated at Winchester College and the Royal Indian Engineering College, Coopers Hill. He served in the British Army, on the General List, in the First World War from 1914 to 1919, reaching the rank of Captain. He also served on the Claims Commission in Belgium from 1916–1917. He was decorated with the Military Cross, the Order of the Crown of Belgium, and the Croix de Guerre.

After the First World War, Pierrepont served as a Justice of the Peace for the County of London. He represented Brixton as a Municipal Reform Party member of the London County Council from 1922 to 1946. He unsuccessfully contested Broxtowe as a Conservative in 1929. In 1940 he succeeded a cousin as Earl Manvers.

Lord Manvers died in February 1955, aged 73, when the Earldom became extinct. A memorial to him is in the parish church at Perlethorpe.

Marriage & Children
In 1918 Pierrepont married Marie-Louise Roosevelt Butterfield (1889–1984), daughter of Sir Frederick Butterfield of Cliffe Castle, Keighley, and they had three children:

 Lady Mary Helen Venetia Pierrepont (born 22 May 1920, died 21 February 1930)
 The Hon. Evelyn Louis Butterfield Pierrepont (born 8 May 1924, died 29 September 1928)
 Lady Frederica Rozelle Ridgway Pierrepont (born 17 November 1925, died 22 June 2015).  Lady Rozelle was an author under the pen name Rozelle Raynes.  She married Major Alexander Montgomerie Greaves Beattie in 1953 (divorced 1961) and Richard Hollings Raynes in 1965.  She inherited the Pierrepont estates on the death of her father.

Marie-Louise, Countess Manvers, was a talented and productive artist under the name of Marie-Louise Pierrepont.

References

External links

1881 births
1955 deaths
People educated at Winchester College
Alumni of the Royal Indian Engineering College
Earls in the Peerage of the United Kingdom
British Army General List officers
Members of London County Council
Municipal Reform Party politicians
English justices of the peace

Recipients of the Military Cross
Recipients of the Croix de Guerre 1914–1918 (France)
Recipients of the Order of the Crown (Belgium)
Gervas